Aduana Football Club is a professional football club, based in Dormaa Ahenkro, Bono Region, Ghana. The club is competing in the Ghanaian Premier League. It made history by winning the Ghana Premier League at their first attempt with 53 points. It became the ninth club to win the Ghana Premier League in its 54-year-old history.

History

Early years 
In 1984, four natives of Dormaa Ahenkro, Bono Region led by Agya Donkor, a goldsmith and supported by Kofi Boahen, Iddrisa Issaka and one other unnamed person registered to play in the regional division 4 league of Ghana, bringing Aduana Stars Football Club to birth in 1985. Due to the decision to adopt the official emblem of the Aduana clan, the group had to seek for the permission from the Aduanahene (who was a paramount chief of Aboabo no 3), which he accepted.

Aduana Stars went on to play in the division 4 of the Ghana league for two years before gaining promotion into the division 3 league in 1986. After that promotion, the club declined and didn't see much progress afterwards.

Take over by Paramount chief or Omanhene of Dormaa Ahenkro
Due to financial issues and the retrogressing of the club, it led to the decision of the Omanhene of Dormaa Osagyefo Oseadeeyo Dr. Nana Agyeman Badu II who is also a High Court Judge in Tema, to take over the management of the club. Subsequent to his take over, the club played in the lower divisions for some years moving up the ladder and finally getting promoted to the Ghana Premier League on 19 August 2009 for the first time in their history, after Richard Addai scored the winning goal in their last fixture against Universal Stars to help them to a 2–1 victory at the Baba Yara Sports Stadium.

2009–2019 
Within this period Aduana Stars won the Ghana Premier League title two times, once in 2010 and once in 2017. They also won the Ghana super cup in 2018 and competed in the CAF Champions league as champions of Ghana on two occasions, in 2011 and in 2018.

2010 (League triumph) 
Aduana's first Ghana Premier League goal was scored by Richard Addai. On 17 October 2009, Aduana Stars picked up their first top flight win in a match against Heart of Lions at the Agyeman Badu I Park in Dormaa through Richard Addae's 73rd-minute strike.

They first won the title in 2009–10 when the team ended the season as the fewest scoring side in the League, setting a world record for least productive champions with 19 goals in 30 matches. With an average of 0.6333 goals per match, they broke the all-time record set by Trabzonspor. The Turkish Süper Lig side became champions in 1979–80 with 25 goals in 30 matches (average of 0.8333).

In a league of 16 clubs that generated 30 matches, Aduana Stars won 15 matches, drew 8 and lost 7 beating Obuase Ashanti Gold S.C to the title by the head-to-head margin which had been adopted by the Ghana premier league board (PLB) in case of a tie, after both clubs garnered 53 points from all the 30 matches played at the end of the season.

They were led by Ghanaian coach Herbert Addo, who helped them to also set the record of being the first newly promoted team to win the league. They also became the first team either than Kumasi-based Asante Kotoko S.C. or Accra based team Accra Hearts of Oak S.C. to win the league within the 21st Century and the 9th team to win the Ghana Premier league since its inception 54 years ago in 1956.

2017–2018 (League triumph & FA Super Cup) 
The second triumph was 2017 after the team had finished as runners-up to Wa All stars in the previous year. They won the 2017/2018 Ghana Premier League after going undefeated in 15 home matches within the season with one game to spare after a 2–1 victory over Elmina Sharks at Nana Agyeman Badu Park at Dormaa-Ahenkro. The team was led by the late Ghanaian coach Yussif Abubakar who described their triumph at that time as a well hard fought league title victory. They completed the season with a 6-point gap between them and the second place team West African Football Academy (WAFA), with 16 wins, 9 draws and 6 loses. They were awarded $30,000 equivalent to Ghs 180,000 as prize money for winning the league The team later parted ways with Herbert Addo in August 2011

2020–present 
After several distractions to the Ghana premier league from 2017 due to the dissolution of the GFA in June 2018, the 2018 league season was abandoned and the uprising of the deadly COVID-19 pandemic which also caused the 2019–20 league to be cancelled abruptly. Aduana was leading the league prior to the cancellation with more than half of league matches played. The 2020–21 season started in November 2020. In February 2020, Ghanaian coach Paa Kwesi Fabin was signed as head coach who resigned midway through the season. In March 2021, the club appointed Joseph Asare Bediako a former coach of Berekum Chelsea to finish the season. The club finished the 2020–21 season 4th out of 18 clubs and amassed 54 points.

Ownership of Aduana 
Aduana Stars is a traditional club led by the head of the Aduana clan and has a board that comprises chiefs from towns in the Bono region and other regions like Kumawu and Akwamu.

Crest

Grounds 
The club plays their home games at the Agyeman Badu Stadium in Dormaa Ahenkro in the Bono Region

Current squad

Honours
Premier League
Champions: 2010, 2017
Super Cup
Winners: 2018
 Ghalca G6
 Winners (2018)

Performance in CAF competitions
CAF Champions League: 2 appearances
2011 – Preliminary Round
2018 – First Round

CAF Confederation Cup: 1 appearance
2018 – Group Stage

WAFU Club Championship: 1 appearance
2011 – First Round

Club league record

Club captains 

 Emmanuel Akuoko (2015–) General captain
 Godfred Saka (2016–2017)
 Joseph Addo (2017–2018)
 Yahaya Mohammed (2018)
 Elvis Opoku (2019–20)
 Joseph Addo (2020)
 Bright Adjei (2022)

Managers
As of January 2021, List of Aduana Managers since promotion into the Ghana Premier League in 2009.

Seasons 
2020-2021 Aduana Stars F.C season

References

 
Football clubs in Ghana
1985 establishments in Ghana
Association football clubs established in 1985
Sports clubs in Ghana